In mathematics, the conjugate transpose, also known as the Hermitian transpose, of an  complex matrix  is an  matrix obtained by transposing  and applying complex conjugate on each entry (the complex conjugate of  being , for real numbers  and ).
or

For real matrices, the conjugate transpose is just the transpose, .

Definition
The conjugate transpose of an  matrix  is formally defined by

This definition can also be written as

where  denotes the transpose and  denotes the matrix with complex conjugated entries.

Other names for the conjugate transpose of a matrix are Hermitian conjugate, adjoint matrix or transjugate. The conjugate transpose of a matrix  can be denoted by any of these symbols:
 , commonly used in linear algebra
 , commonly used in linear algebra
  (sometimes pronounced as A dagger), commonly used in quantum mechanics
 , although this symbol is more commonly used for the Moore–Penrose pseudoinverse

In some contexts,  denotes the matrix with only complex conjugated entries and no transposition.

Example
Suppose we want to calculate the conjugate transpose of the following matrix .

We first transpose the matrix:

Then we conjugate every entry of the matrix:

Basic remarks
A square matrix  with entries  is called
 Hermitian or self-adjoint if ; i.e., .
 Skew Hermitian or antihermitian if ; i.e., .
 Normal if .
 Unitary if , equivalently , equivalently .

The conjugate transpose "adjoint" matrix  should not be confused with the adjugate, which is also sometimes called adjoint.

Motivation 
The conjugate transpose can be motivated by noting that complex numbers can be usefully represented by  real matrices, obeying matrix addition and multiplication:

Thus, an  matrix of complex numbers could be well represented by a  matrix of real numbers. The conjugate transpose, therefore, arises very naturally as the result of simply transposing such a matrix—when viewed back again as an  matrix made up of complex numbers.

Properties of the conjugate transpose
  for any complex number  and any  matrix .
  for any  matrix  and any  matrix . Note that the order of the factors is reversed.
  for any  matrix , i.e. Hermitian transposition is an involution.
  is invertible if and only if  is invertible, and in that case .

Generalizations
The concept of adjoint operators between Hilbert spaces can thus be seen as a generalization of the conjugate transpose of matrices with respect to an orthonormal basis.

See also
Complex dot product
Hermitian adjoint
Adjugate matrix

References

External links
 

Linear algebra
Matrices